Iki-Burulsky District (İk Buurla rayon) is an administrative and municipal district (raion), one of the thirteen in the Republic of Kalmykia, Russia.  Its administrative center is the rural locality (a settlement) of Iki-Burul. As of the 2010 Census, the total population of the district was 11,424, with the population of Iki-Burul accounting for 35.5% of that number.

Geography
The district is located in the southwest of Kalmykia, in the area of the Yergeni hills.

History
The district was established in 1965.

Administrative and municipal status
Within the framework of administrative divisions, Iki-Burulsky District is one of the thirteen in the Republic of Kalmykia. The district is divided into thirteen rural administrations which comprise twenty-eight rural localities. As a municipal division, the district is incorporated as Iki-Burulsky Municipal District. Its thirteen rural administrations are incorporated as thirteen rural settlements within the municipal district. The settlement of Iki-Burul serves as the administrative center of both the administrative and municipal district.

References

Notes

Sources

Districts of Kalmykia
 
States and territories established in 1965
